Theophilus Swift (1746–1815) was an Irish writer and poet.

Early life
He was born the son of Deane Swift of Dublin, (who was a cousin of Dr. Jonathan Swift) and educated at St Mary Hall, Oxford, graduating B.A. in 1767.

Career
He studied law at the Middle Temple and was called to the bar in 1774. After practising law for a few years, he moved to live in Dublin after inheriting some property in Limerick after the death of his father in 1783. In 1789 he was wounded in a duel in London with Colonel Charles Lennox (afterwards fourth Duke of Richmond and Lennox) following deprecatory remarks he made in a pamphlet. In another pamphlet entitled Animadversions on the Fellows of Trinity College, Dublin he accused some of the fellows at Trinity with having broken the rule which prohibited them from marrying, earning him a twelve months' prison sentence in the Marshalsea prison for libel.

In 1800 he was awarded the Cunningham Medal by the Royal Irish Academy for his essay on The origin and progress of rhyme.

Death
He died in 1815 in Dublin.

Works
 The Gamblers, a poem (anon.), 1777
 The Temple of Folly, in four cantos, London, 1787
 Poetical Address to His Majesty, 1788
 The Female Parliament, a poem, 1789
 The Monster at Large, 1791
 An Essay on Rime, Transactions of Royal Irish Academy, 1801
 The Accomplished Quack: A Treatise on Political Charlatanism, Dublin, 1811

References

Attribution

1746 births
1815 deaths
Alumni of St Mary Hall, Oxford
Members of the Middle Temple
Irish poets
Writers from Dublin (city)
18th-century Irish writers
19th-century Irish writers